Firmin Aerts (16 August 1929) is a former Belgian politician. He was a member of the Chamber of Representatives and was Senator of Belgium.

References
 Firmin Aerts. Visie en inzet. Buigen niet breken. Liber Amicorum ter gelegenheid van zijn zeventigste verjaardag, Sint-Truiden,Carlier, 1999.

Living people
Members of the Chamber of Representatives (Belgium)
1929 births